Once Upon a Time in Venice is a 2017 American crime comedy film directed by Mark Cullen in his directorial debut, who co-wrote with his brother Robb. The film stars Bruce Willis, Jason Momoa, John Goodman, Thomas Middleditch, Famke Janssen, Adam Goldberg, and Jessica Gomes. The film follows private detective Steve Ford (Willis) and his assistant (Middleditch) as they face many tasks, notably the capture of Ford's dog by a gang leader named Spyder (Momoa).

Once Upon a Time in Venice was released in a limited theatrical release and through video on demand on June 16, 2017, by RLJ Entertainment. The film received negative reviews from critics.

Plot
In Venice, Los Angeles, private investigator Steve Ford gets his assistant John to locate and retrieve a young woman, Nola, only for Ford to have sex with her, before being chased by her brothers who hired him. He hides at the work of his friend, Tino, and agrees to steal back his stolen car from a gang leader named Spider. Ford disguises himself as a pizza man, and barely gets the car out alive.

Later, Ford juggles time with his dog, his sister-in-law Katey and her daughter, his friend and shop owner Dave Phillips going through a divorce, and a new job for a real estate salesman named Lou the Jew regarding lewd graffiti appearances, for the price of a new house. Spider's clients robs Katey's home, taking the dog too before giving him to Spider himself. Ford returns to Spider's home, where they make a deal in which Ford pays back some money in exchange for the dog.

Meanwhile, Ford also attempts to help Phillips plead a financial deal with his wife, but he ignores his advice and regretting quickly after. After attempts to capture the graffiti artist fails, Ford sends John to search, who runs into Nola, forming a romance and distracts him during a stakeout.

After getting the cash from Yuri, a loan shark, he finds Spider who tells him his girlfriend, Lupe, took the dog along with some cocaine. Spider makes a deal to get back the dog and give back some money, if Ford finds and gets the cocaine back. After tracking Lupe's whereabouts in a motel, Ford breaks into her room, and becomes subdued by a transvestite before escaping. Later, Ford and John uncover the artist's identity and find out he was hired by rivals of Lou.

After Phillips helps Ford pay back Yuri with the money made from his shop's closing sale, Ford recruits Phillips to confront Lou's rivals, and steal back the cocaine from a gang led by Prince, who Lupe and another member of Spider's gang have sold it to. Fearing their exchange is a set up, Ford, Phillips, and Nola's brothers, who agree to help as a favor from John, infiltrate Spider's house. After being caught in a standoff, Spider simply follows through on the deal, with the dog and money being returned.

Later, after receiving the new house, Ford gives it to his sister and niece, and as they barbecue with Phillips, John is kidnapped by Prince where he and his gang leave him behind as they head off to the barbecue.

Cast
 Bruce Willis as Steve Ford, a Los Angeles private detective whose dog is stolen by a gang.
 Jason Momoa as Spyder, a drug lord who forces Steve to do some jobs for the safety of his dog.
 John Goodman as Dave Phillips, Steve's best friend.
 Thomas Middleditch as John, an assistant in his operation to Steve.
 Famke Janssen as Katey Ford, Steve's sister-in-law.
 Adam Goldberg as Lou the Jew, a real estate developer
 Jessica Gomes as Nola
 Stephanie Sigman as Lupe, Spyder's girlfriend.
 Wood Harris as Prince
 Ken Davitian as Yuri
 Victor Ortiz as Chuy
 Elisabeth Röhm as Anne Phillips, Dave's ex
 Adrian Martinez as Tino, the owner of a local pizza store who wants to help Steve.
 Christopher McDonald as Mr. Carter
 Ron Funches as Mocha
 Sol Rodriguez
 Kal Penn as Rajeesh, a grocery store clerk.
 Emily Robinson as Taylor

Production
By May 16, 2015, Bruce Willis was cast to star in a comedy film playing a Los Angeles private detective whose dog is stolen by a gang. Mark and Robb Cullen penned the script with the former making his directorial debut, and they would also produce the film along with Nicolas Chartier, Zev Foreman, and Laura Ford, while Voltage Pictures financing and selling the film at Cannes. In June 16, 2015, Jason Momoa, Thomas Middleditch and Famke Janssen joined the cast of the film, Momoa to play the gang leader who forces Willis' character to do some jobs for his dog, Middleditch to play Willis' assistant in his operation, while Janssen would play Willis' sister-in-law. Later on June 30, 2015, John Goodman, Stephanie Sigman, Adrian Martinez, Kal Penn, and Emily Robinson round out the remaining cast of the film, Goodman playing Willis' best friend, Sigman playing Momoa's character's girlfriend, Martinez playing the owner of a local pizza store who wants to help Willis' character, while Penn would play a grocery store clerk. On July 13, 2015, Adam Goldberg was set to play Lou the Jew in the film. Next day on July 14, 2015, four more joined the cast of the film, including Tyga, Ken Davitian, David Arquette, and Victor Ortiz.

Actor Ralph Garman was meant to play a role in the movie, but he revealed on his Hollywood Babble-On podcast that his character was written out of the film when Willis refused to shoot a scene between them. The Cullen brothers offered him another role, and again, Willis declined to shoot the scene. The next day, the producers of the film stated that the scene needed to be cut, leaving Garman without an appearance in the film. The story mirrored that of his co-host, director Kevin Smith, who had similar stories of Willis' behaviour during the filming of Cop Out.

Principal photography began on June 29, 2015, in Venice, Los Angeles. The film was shooting under the working title Going Under.

Release
In April 4, 2017, RLJ Entertainment acquired distribution rights to the film. It was released in a limited release and through video on demand on June 16, 2017.
It was released in the UK as L.A. Vengeance.

Reception

Box office
Once Upon a Time in Venice grossed $855,888 in the international box office; countries include United Arab Emirates, Hungary, Turkey, Portugal, South Africa, Romania, Ukraine, Lithuania, Bulgaria, Slovenia, Greece, Iceland, Russia, and South Korea.

Critical response
Once Upon a Time in Venice received an 21% rating on Rotten Tomatoes based on 38 reviews and an average rating of 4.2/10. The site's critics consensus reads: "Once Upon a Time in Venice has a little more of a spark than typical late-period Bruce Willis tough guy movies, but it's still a steep, disappointing tumble from his best work." Metacritic gave the film a score of 28 out of 100 based on 9 reviews, indicating "generally unfavorable reviews".

References

External links

 
 
 Once Upon a Time in Venice at The Numbers

2017 films
2017 independent films
Films shot in Venice, Los Angeles
Films shot in Los Angeles
Films set in Los Angeles
Films about dogs
American action comedy films
American detective films
2017 action comedy films
Voltage Pictures films
2017 directorial debut films
2017 comedy films
2010s English-language films
2010s American films